Taisha may refer to:
 Japanese topics:
 Cultural features:
 Taisha-zukuri, type of Shinto shrine
 Taisha joseki, joseki maneuver in game of Go
 Japanese geography:
 Taisha, Shimane, town in the Hikawa District of Shimane
 Taisha Line, railway route in Izumo area
 Political culture of Ecuador:
 Taisha, Ecuador (see List of cities in Ecuador)
 Taisha Canton, administrative area
Taisha (band), musical ensemble from New Zealand
Ta’isha, Arab nomadic tribe of Sudan